National Native News is a United States based public radio headlines package service owned by the Kohanic Broadcast Corporation. It produces and distributes a daily, 5-minute segment of stories and features related to Native American and Canadian First Nations issues that is used by public radio stations to supplement their locally produced news programming. It is the only daily radio program in the United States focusing on Native American topics.

National Native News was established in 1987 with an initial funding grant from the Corporation for Public Broadcasting. It was originally distributed by the Alaska Public Radio Network (APRN) and its broadcast reach limited to Alaska. In 1995 APRN turned over the program to Kohanic Broadcast Corporation, and syndication began shortly thereafter, with programs distributed by the Public Radio satellite system. The program moved its studios to Albuquerque, New Mexico in 2003.

National Native News is carried on more than 200 radio stations in the U.S. and Canada, including KUT, KHSU, KGOU, KNBA, and others. A portion of the program's broadcasts have been archived in the National Museum of the American Indian.

References

External links
 1988 Christian Science Monitor story on the launch of National Native News

American news radio programs
American public radio programs
1987 radio programme debuts
Native American radio